Yung Ta Institute of Technology and Commerce (YTIT) is a private university located in Linluo Township, Pingtung County, Taiwan.

History
According to statistics compiled by the Ministry of Education in 2013, the Yung Ta Institute of Technology and Commerce had an enrollment of less than 1,000 students, and was considered a potential merger candidate alongside other private educational institutions. The education ministry announced in February 2014 that Yung Ta had been barred from enrolling any new students for one year. Its principal declared in August 2014 that the university would close down soon. However, Yung Ta remained open through 2019. The education ministry stated that if the institute did not close by 8 January 2020, the ministry would force the school to close.

Faculties
 Department of Mechanical Engineering
 Department of Vehicle Engineering
 Department of Electronic Engineering
 Department of Electrical Engineering
 Department of Architectural Engineering
 Department of Industrial and Business Management
 Department of Business Administration
 Department of Marketing Management
 Department of Information Management
 Department of Biotechnology
 Department of Cosmetic Application and Management
 Department of Sports, Health and Leisure
 Department of Applied Foreign Languages

Transportation
The school was accessible East of Guilai Station of the Taiwan Railways.

See also
 List of universities in Taiwan

References

1967 establishments in Taiwan
Educational institutions established in 1967
Universities and colleges in Pingtung County